Mad Mad World is the second studio album by Canadian rock singer Tom Cochrane, originally released in 1991 in Canada and in the United States on February 17, 1992. The first single from the album, "Life Is a Highway", became a hit in late 1991, reaching number one in Canada and number six on the Billboard Hot 100 in the United States.

The album earned Cochrane four Juno Awards including Album of the Year, Single of the Year, Male Vocalist of the Year, and Songwriter of the Year. In addition, Cochrane won two SOCAN Awards and an ASCAP Award. Mad Mad World achieved a Diamond sales award in Canada for selling more than 1 million copies in Cochrane's native Canada.

The album also included the hits "No Regrets" (No. 3 RPM Charts), "Sinking Like a Sunset" (No. 2 RPM Charts), "Washed Away" (No. 7 RPM Charts), "Bigger Man" and the title track "Mad Mad World". The album was produced by Joe Hardy and was recorded in Memphis, Tennessee and at three different Ontario studios: Metalworks Studios in Mississauga, Hungry Hollow Studio in Georgetown and at Cochrane's cabin in Oakville.

Upon the album's initial releases in the US and Canada, the album featured two different album covers. The original album cover (designed by Ralph Alfonso) was on the initial Canadian release in 1991, while the alternate album cover was on the US release for the album in 1992. The alternate cover is now the main album cover for the album.

On October 28, 2016, Cochrane released an expanded 25th-anniversary edition of the album. Included on the expanded album is "Love Is a Highway", the original demo version of the album's first single, and a second disc featuring a concert recorded on May 14, 1992, on the Mad Mad World Tour in Chicago, Illinois.

Track listing

Personnel 
 Tom Cochrane – vocals, acoustic and electric guitars, piano, harmonica, percussion, bass, keyboards, slide guitar
 John Webster – percussion, piano, organ
 Spider Sinnaeve – bass
 Mickey Curry – drums
 Kim Mitchell – lead guitar on "Brave and Crazy"
 Mladen – guitar
 Keith Scott – guitar on "Sinking Like a Sunset"
 David Gogo – guitar
 Joe Hardy – percussion
 Dave Harding – viola
 Molly Johnson – backing vocals
 John Cody – backing vocals
 Annette Ducharme – backing vocals
 Kathy Cochrane – backing vocals
 Joe Hardy – producer (except "All the King's Men")
 Noel Golden – engineer
 Joe Hardy – production, engineering, mixing, percussion
 Bob Shindle – engineer
 John Bailey – engineer
 Bob Ludwig – mastering
 Great Southern Memphis Section – horns, horn arrangements
 Peter Schenkman – cello

Charts

References 

1991 albums
Tom Cochrane albums
Capitol Records albums
Juno Award for Album of the Year albums
Albums recorded at Metalworks Studios